Biała Kępa  is a settlement in the administrative district of Gmina Świeszyno, within Koszalin County, West Pomeranian Voivodeship, in north-western Poland.

The settlement has a population of 10.

References

Villages in Koszalin County